Vice-Admiral Johan Charl Walters  (19191993) was a former Chief of the South African Navy.

Early life
He was born on 9 January 1919 in Moorreesburg and was christened on 2 March 1919.

Naval career

He was trained at the General Botha Training college from 1934 to 1935 and joined the Ellerman Hall Line after leaving General Botha.

He served in World War II on a number of ships:
 19411941 - Sub Lt. 
 19411942  in command as a Sub Lieutenant
 1943 
 1944 Lt 
 19441945 
 1947  19471954
 Lt Cdr 
 1955 , 
 1956 
 October 1957 to 1963 LCDR/CDR/CAPT  He was promoted to Commander in December 1960.
 19641974 Commodore and Hydrographer of the Navy
 19751976 Rear Admiral Chief of Naval Staff Logistics
 1 October 197730 January 1980 Vice Admiral Chief of Navy

Awards and decorations

References

1919 births
1993 deaths
People from Moorreesburg
White South African people
South African military personnel of World War II
Chiefs of the South African Navy